Zsófia Kisbán (born 19 November 1997) is a Hungarian sprint canoeist.

She competed at the 2021 ICF Canoe Sprint World Championships, winning a silver medal in the C-1 5000 m distance.

References

External links

1997 births
Living people
Hungarian female canoeists
ICF Canoe Sprint World Championships medalists in Canadian
21st-century Hungarian women